was a JR East railway station located in Kesennuma, Miyagi Prefecture, Japan. The station was closed following the 2011 Tōhoku earthquake and tsunami and has now been replaced by a provisional bus rapid transit line.

History
Kamishishiori Station opened on 19 March 1932. The station was absorbed into the JR East network upon the privatization of the Japan National Railways (JNR) on April 1, 1987. Operations were suspended after the 11 March 2011 Tōhoku earthquake and tsunami and have been replaced by a provisional bus service.

Lines
Kamishishiori Station was served by the Ōfunato Line, and is located 69.5 rail kilometers from the terminus of the line at Ichinoseki Station.

Layout
Kamishishiori Station had two opposed side platforms connected by a level crossing. The station was unattended.

Platforms

Surrounding area

 Kesennuma Shiroyama Elementary School

External links
 JR East Station information 

Railway stations in Miyagi Prefecture
Ōfunato Line
Railway stations in Japan opened in 1932
Railway stations closed in 2011
Kesennuma